European route E 60 is the second longest road in the International E-road network. It runs , from Brest, France (on the Atlantic coast), to Irkeshtam, Kyrgyzstan (on the border with China).

Route 

: Brest (E 50)
: Brest - Quimper - Nantes (E 3)
: Nantes (E 3 / E 62)
: Nantes (E 62) - Angers (E 501)
: Angers (E 501) - Tours (E 5)
: Tours (E 502 / E 604, Start of Concurrency with E 5) - Orléans (E 9, End of Concurrency with E 5)
: Orléans (E 5) - Courtenay (E 511, Start of Concurrency with E 15)
: Courtenay (E 15 / E 511) - Auxerre - Beaune (End of Concurrency with E 15)
: Beaune
: Beaune (E 15 / E 17 / E 21) - Besançon (E 23) - Belfort (E 27) - Mulhouse (E 54)
: Mulhouse (E 54, Start of Concurrency with E 25) - Saint-Louis

 
: Basel (E 35, End of Concurrency with E 25) - Baden
: Baden - Zürich (Start of Concurrency with E 41)
: Zürich (E 41) - Winterthur (End of Concurrency with E 41)
: Winterthur (E 41) - St. Margrethen (E 43)
: St. Margrethen (Start of Concurrency with E 43)

: Höchst - Bregenz (E43)
: Bregenz (End of Concurrency with E43) - Feldkirch - Bludenz
: Bludenz - Landeck
: Landeck - Innsbruck (E533, Start of Concurrency with E45) - Wörgl (E641) - Kufstein

: Kiefersfelden - Rosenheim (E 52, End of Concurrency with E 45)
: Rosenheim (E 45, Start of Concurrency with E 52) - Bad Reichenhall (E 641)

: Salzburg (End of Concurrency with E52, Start of Cocurrency with E55) - Sattledt (E56 / E57) - Linz (E552, End of concurrency with E55) - Altlengbach
: Altlengbach - Wien (E59)
: Wien (E58 / E59, Towards E49 / E461)
: Wien (Start of Concurrency with E58) - Bruck an der Leitha (End of Concurrency with E58) - Nickelsdorf

: Hegyeshalom - Mosonmagyaróvár (End of Concurrency with E65, Start of Concurrency with E75) - Budapest
: Budapest (E71 / E73 / End of Concurrency with E75)
: Budapest - Törökszentmiklós
: Törökszentmiklós - Püspökladány
: Püspökladány - Berettyóújfalu
: Berettyóújfalu (Start of Concurrency with E79) - Nagykereki 

: Borș - Oradea (E671, End of Concurrency with E79) - Cluj-Napoca (E81 / E576)
: Cluj-Napoca (E576, Start of Concurrency with E81) - Turda (End of Concurrency with E81) - Târgu Mureș
: Târgu Mureș - Brașov (E68 / E574)
: Brașov (E68 / E574) - Ploiești (E577) - București
: București (E85)
: București (Start of Concurrency with E85) - Urziceni (End of Concurrency with E85)
: Urziceni (E85) - Slobozia (E584) - Ovidiu (E87) - Constanţa (E81 / E87)

Gap (Black Sea)
 Constanţa -  Poti; no direct ferry link; ferry to  Batumi, 75 km from Poti via 

: Poti (E97) - Senaki (E97)
: Senaki (E97) - Samtredia (E692) - Khashuri
 ს 1: Khashuri - Tbilisi (E117)
: Tbilisi (Start of Concurrency with E117) - Rustavi (End of Concurrency with E117) 
: Rustavi - Tsiteli Khidi

 M2: Qırmızı Körpü - Qazax - Ganja - Yevlax - Hajiqabul (E002) - Ələt (E119) - Baku

Gap (Caspian Sea)
 Baku -  Türkmenbaşy; ferry link

M37 M37: Türkmenbaşy (Start of Concurrency with E121) - Balkanabat - Serdar (End of concurrency with E121) - Ashgabat (E003) - Tejen - Mary - Türkmenabat

 M37 Road: Olot - Bukhara
 A380 Road: Bukhara - Qarshi - G‘uzor (E005)
 M39 Road: G‘uzor (E005) - Sherobod - Termez
 M41 Road: Termez (Towards )  - Denov

 РБ02 Road: Tursunzoda - Dushanbe (E123)
 РБ04 Road: Dushanbe - Vahdat
 РБ07 Road: Vahdat - Obi Garm - Jirgatol - Border of Kyrgyzstan

  ЭМ-06 Road: Border of Tajikistan - Karamyk - Sary-Tash
  ЭМ-05 Road: Sary-Tash - Irkeshtam - Border of China 

: Irkeshtam

External links 
 UN Economic Commission for Europe: Overall Map of E-road Network (2007)

60
E060
E060
E060
E060
E060
E060
E060
E060
E060
E060
E060
E060